Strada statale 38 dello Stelvio (SS 38) is a motorway that connects Valtellina with the South Tyrolean Vinschgau via the Stelvio Pass (2758 meters), to continue in Etschtal until it reaches Bolzano.

References 

38
Transport in Lombardy
Transport in South Tyrol
Transport in Trentino